Crossed Over is a 2002 Canadian television film directed by Bobby Roth and starring Diane Keaton as Beverly Lowry and Jennifer Jason Leigh as Karla Faye Tucker.  it is based on Lowry's memoir Crossed Over: A Murder, A Memoir.

Cast
Diane Keaton as Beverly Lowry
Jennifer Jason Leigh as Karla Faye Tucker
Maury Chaykin as Ethan Lowry
Nick Roth as Peter Lowry
Karl Pruner as Henry Quinn
Patrick Galligan as Dana Brown

References

External links
 
 

English-language Canadian films
CBS network films
Canadian drama television films
2002 television films
2002 films
Films directed by Bobby Roth
Films about capital punishment
2000s Canadian films